Hopson is an unincorporated hamlet in Caldwell County, Kentucky, United States. It consists of only a few residences; the general store once recently operating there, has been closed since 2014.

References

Unincorporated communities in Caldwell County, Kentucky
Unincorporated communities in Kentucky